XHPLPZ-FM is a radio station on 91.1 FM in La Paz, Baja California Sur. It is owned by CPS Media and is known as Radiante FM.

History
XHPLPZ was awarded in the IFT-4 radio auction of 2017 and came to air on July 9, 2018. CPS Media, an arm of Grupo Editorial Tribuna, was formed from the three FM stations won in the IFT-4 auction by Compañía Periodística Sudcaliforniana (La Paz, San José del Cabo and Puerto Vallarta), as well as the three TV transmitters in the same cities that were won in the IFT-6 television station auction.

Attempts by Tribuna to enter broadcasting had stretched back to 1995, when the company made requests for the federal government to make available new commercial radio stations. While these were approved in early 2000, the government of Vicente Fox did not award any of the stations.

References

Radio stations established in 2018
2018 establishments in Mexico
Radio stations in La Paz, Baja California Sur